Michael Benjamin Callahan (born January 7, 1987) is an American soccer player and coach.

Career

Youth and amateur
Callahan was born in Red Bank, New Jersey. He grew up in Cary, North Carolina and attended Green Hope High School.  He played college soccer at the University of North Carolina at Chapel Hill, where he was named to the ACC's All-Freshman Team in 2005, was named to the ACC Academic Honor Roll in his freshman, sophomore and junior years, and earned All-ACC and All-American honors in 2008.

During his college years Callahan also played four seasons in the USL Premier Development League with the Raleigh Elite team, which later became the Cary RailHawks U23s.

Professional
Callahan joined the USL First Division expansion franchise Austin Aztex in 2009. He made his professional debut on April 25, 2009, as a second-half substitute in Austin's game against Cleveland City Stars. Callahan set an infamous USL First Division record by getting a red card, and subsequent ejection, 53 seconds into a game for a dangerous slide tackle.

After two seasons with Austin, Callahan signed with Richmond Kickers of the USL Pro league on March 29, 2011.
 Richmond re-signed Callahan to a multi-year contract on November 16, 2011.

References

External links
 Austin Aztex bio
 UNC bio

1987 births
Living people
American soccer players
North Carolina Tar Heels men's soccer players
North Carolina FC U23 players
Cary Clarets players
Austin Aztex FC players
Richmond Kickers players
North Carolina FC players
Soccer players from New Jersey
USL League Two players
USL First Division players
USSF Division 2 Professional League players
North American Soccer League players
Sportspeople from Monmouth County, New Jersey
Association football midfielders
People from Red Bank, New Jersey